The Vilayet of Constantinople or Istanbul was a first-level administrative division (vilayet) of the Ottoman Empire, encompassing the imperial capital, Constantinople (Istanbul).

History
It had a special organisation, as it was placed under the immediate authority of the Minister of Police (Zabtiye Naziri), who filled a role equivalent to the governor (wali) in other vilayets.

It included Stamboul (the inner city, known in Turkish as Istanbul) and the quarters of Eyüp, Kassim Pacha, Pera and Galata, and all the suburbs from Silivri on the Sea of Marmara to the Black Sea on the European side, and from Ghili on the Black Sea to the end of the Gulf of İzmit on the Asiatic side.

In 1878, a provincial structure, with a governor (wāli) and provincial officers, was established  to perform the same functions within Constantinople that provincial authorities performed elsewhere in the Empire.

Administrative divisions
Sanjaks and kazas, circa 1877:
 Sanjak of Stamboul: kazas of Fatih-Sultan-Mehmet, Eyüp, Kartal, Prince Islands
 Sanjak of Pera: kazas of Galata, Yeniköy.
 Sanjak of Scutari: kaza of Beykoz.
 Sanjak of Büyükçekmece, kaza of Çatalca.

Demography

See also
 History of Istanbul

References

External links

Vilayets of the Ottoman Empire in Anatolia
Vilayets of the Ottoman Empire in Europe
History of Istanbul Province
1867 establishments in the Ottoman Empire
States and territories established in 1867
States and territories disestablished in 1922
1922 disestablishments in the Ottoman Empire